In mathematics, Hochschild homology (and cohomology) is a homology theory for associative algebras over rings. There is also a theory for Hochschild homology of certain functors.

Definition of Hochschild homology of algebras
Let k be a field, A an associative k-algebra, and M an A-bimodule. The enveloping algebra of A is the tensor product  of A with its opposite algebra. Bimodules over A are essentially the same as modules over the enveloping algebra of A, so in particular A and M can be considered as Ae-modules.  defined the Hochschild homology and cohomology group of A with coefficients in M  in terms of the Tor functor and Ext functor by

Hochschild complex
Let k be a ring, A an associative k-algebra that is a projective k-module, and M an A-bimodule. We will write  for the n-fold tensor product of A over k. The chain complex that gives rise to Hochschild homology is given by

with boundary operator  defined by

If we let

then , so  is a chain complex called the Hochschild complex, and its homology is the Hochschild homology of A with coefficients in M.

Remark
The maps  are face maps making the family of modules  a simplicial object in the category of k-modules, i.e., a functor Δo → k-mod, where Δ is the simplex category and k-mod is the category of k-modules. Here Δo is the opposite category of Δ. The degeneracy maps are defined by

Hochschild homology is the homology of this simplicial module.

Relation with the Bar complex 
There is a similar looking complex  called the Bar complex which formally looks very similar to the Hochschild complexpg 4-5. In fact, the Hochschild complex  can be recovered from the Bar complex asgiving an explicit isomorphism.

As a derived self-intersection 
There's another useful interpretation of the Hochschild complex in the case of commutative rings, and more generally, for sheaves of commutative rings: it is constructed from the derived self-intersection of a scheme (or even derived scheme)  over some base scheme . For example, we can form the derived fiber productwhich has the sheaf of derived rings . Then, if embed  with the diagonal mapthe Hochschild complex is constructed as the pullback of the derived self intersection of the diagonal in the diagonal product schemeFrom this interpretation, it should be clear the Hochschild homology should have some relation to the Kähler differentials  since the Kähler differentials can be defined using a self-intersection from the diagonal, or more generally, the cotangent complex  since this is the derived replacement for the Kähler differentials. We can recover the original definition of the Hochschild complex of a commutative -algebra  by setting and Then, the Hochschild complex is quasi-isomorphic toIf  is a flat -algebra, then there's the chain of isomorphismgiving an alternative but equivalent presentation of the Hochschild complex.

Hochschild homology of functors

The homology of this simplicial module is the Hochschild homology of the functor F. The above definition of Hochschild homology of commutative algebras is the special case where F is the Loday functor.

Loday functor
A skeleton for the category of finite pointed sets is given by the objects

where 0 is the basepoint, and the morphisms are the basepoint preserving set maps. Let A be a commutative k-algebra and M be a symmetric A-bimodule.

A morphism

is sent to the morphism  given by

where

Another description of Hochschild homology of algebras
The Hochschild homology of a commutative algebra A with coefficients in a symmetric A-bimodule M is the homology associated to the composition

and this definition agrees with the one above.

Examples 
The examples of Hochschild homology computations can be stratified into a number of distinct cases with fairly general theorems describing the structure of the homology groups and the homology ring  for an associative algebra . For the case of commutative algebras, there are a number of theorems describing the computations over characteristic 0 yielding a straightforward understanding of what the homology and cohomology compute.

Commutative characteristic 0 case 
In the case of commutative algebras  where , the Hochschild homology has two main theorems concerning smooth algebras, and more general non-flat algebras ; but, the second is a direct generalization of the first. In the smooth case, i.e. for a smooth algebra , the Hochschild-Kostant-Rosenberg theorempg 43-44 states there is an isomorphism  for every . This isomorphism can be described explicitly using the anti-symmetrization map. That is, a differential -form has the map
If the algebra  isn't smooth, or even flat, then there is an analogous theorem using the cotangent complex. For a simplicial resolution , we set . Then, there exists a descending -filtration  on  whose graded pieces are isomorphic to 
Note this theorem makes it accessible to compute the Hochschild homology not just for smooth algebras, but also for local complete intersection algebras.

Polynomial rings over the rationals 

Commutative characteristic p case 
In the characteristic p case, there is a userful counter-example to the Hochschild-Kostant-Rosenberg theorem which elucidates for the need of a theory beyond simplicial algebras for defining Hochschild homology. Consider the -algebra . Then, the Hochschild complex is given byIn order to compute this, we must resolve  as an -algebra. Observe that the algebra structure

forces . This gives the degree zero term of the complex. The algebra structure comes from general theory on divided power algebras and differential graded algebras. Note this computation is seen as a technical artifact because the ring  is not well behaved. For instance, . One technical response to this problem is through Topological Hochschild homology, where the base ring  is replaced by the sphere spectrum .

Topological Hochschild homology

Applying this to the category  of spectra, and  being the Eilenberg–MacLane spectrum associated to an ordinary ring  yields topological Hochschild homology, denoted . The (non-topological) Hochschild homology introduced above can be reinterpreted along these lines, by taking for  the derived category of -modules (as an ∞-category).

It induces an isomorphism on homotopy groups in degrees 0, 1, and 2. In general, however, they are different, and  tends to yield simpler groups than HH. For example,

is the polynomial ring (with x in degree 2), compared to the ring of divided powers in one variable.

 showed that the Hasse–Weil zeta function of a smooth proper variety over  can be expressed using regularized determinants involving topological Hochschild homology.

See also
 Cyclic homology

References

 Jean-Louis Loday, Cyclic Homology, Grundlehren der mathematischen Wissenschaften Vol. 301, Springer (1998) 
 Richard S. Pierce, Associative Algebras, Graduate Texts in Mathematics (88), Springer, 1982.

External links

Introductory articles 

 Dylan G.L. Allegretti, Differential Forms on Noncommutative Spaces. An elementary introduction to noncommutative geometry which uses Hochschild homology to generalize differential forms).
 
 Topological Hochschild homology in arithmetic geometry

Commutative case

Noncommutative case 

 
 
 

Ring theory
Homological algebra